The government of the state of Rhode Island is prescribed from a multitude of sources; the main sources are the Rhode Island Constitution, the General Laws, and executive orders. The governmental structure is modeled on the Government of the United States in having three branches: executive, legislative, and judicial.

Legislature

Pursuant to Articles VI, VII, and VIII of the Rhode Island Constitution, the legislature is vested in the Rhode Island General Assembly. The General Assembly is bicameral, composed of the House of Representatives and the Senate. 

The House of Representatives has a total of 75 members currently. The Senate has 38 members. The General Assembly meets in the State House.

Executive branch

The state elects a governor, a lieutenant governor, a secretary of state, a general treasurer, and an attorney general. The governor appoints a Sheriff, who, unlike most other sheriffs, has statewide jurisdiction. The governor appoints many officers to act as commissioners, directors, or other officers. 

The executive authority is vested in the governor, typically through various directors and commissioners. The lieutenant governor, though nominally in the executive branch, is a largely ceremonial position. The governor and lieutenant governor are elected on separate tickets by the electorate of Rhode Island. The governor's offices are located in the State House. Rhode Island is one of the few states that lacks a governor's mansion.

Departments and agencies
Rhode Island government has numerous departments, agencies, and divisions. The major ones are:

Department of Corrections
Department of Transportation
Department of Administration
Department of Public Safety
Department of Health
Department of Revenue
Division of Motor Vehicles
Division of Taxation
Department of Environmental Management
Department of Children, Youths, and Families

Judicial branch

The judicial branch of the state government consists of the Rhode Island Supreme Court and the lower courts, which consist of the Superior Court, Family Court, District Court, Workers' Compensation Court and the Rhode Island Traffic Tribunal.

External links
Rhode Island General Assembly
Governor's Office
State Website

 
Rhode Island